Below are the rosters for the 1992 King Fahd Cup tournament in Saudi Arabia.

Teams

Argentina
Head coach: Alfio Basile

Ivory Coast
Head coach: Yeo Martial

Saudi Arabia
Head coach:  Nélson Rosa Martins

United States
Head coach:  Bora Milutinović

External links

FIFA Confederations Cup squads
Squads